Mark Andrew Bracewell (born 8 October 1955) is a first class cricketer. He played one first-class match for Otago in 1977/78 and one List A one-day game in 1979/80. A right arm medium bowler, he is part of a well known New Zealand cricketing family with three brothers and a son who also played first class cricket. His two brothers and son Michael Bracewell represented New Zealand at international stage. 

Bracewell was born at Auckland in 1955 and educated at Tauranga Boys' College. He played rugby union for Wairarapara-Bush and Wellington and was later a selector for the Otago cricket team.

References

1955 births
Living people
New Zealand cricketers
Otago cricketers
Central Districts cricketers
Mark